The 1999–2000 Elitserien season was the 25th season of the Elitserien, the top level of ice hockey in Sweden. 12 teams participated in the league, and Djurgårdens IF won the championship.

Standings

Playoffs

External links
 Swedish Hockey League official site

Swe
1999–2000 in Swedish ice hockey leagues
Swedish Hockey League seasons